The pale dottyback (Pseudochromis pesi) is a species of fish in the family Pseudochromidae. It is found in, the Red Sea off Egypt, Jordan, and Saudi Arabia.

Sources

pesi
Fish described in 1975
Taxa named by Roger Lubbock
Taxonomy articles created by Polbot